Azerbaijan competed at the 2000 Summer Olympics in Sydney, Australia. They won their first gold medal during these games. 31 competitors, 25 men and 6 women, took part in 14 events in 8 sports.

Medalists

Athletics

Men
Track and road events

Field events

Women
Track and road events

Boxing

Diving

Judo

Shooting

Women

Swimming

Weightlifting

Wrestling

Freestyle

Greco-Roman

References

Wallechinsky, David (2004). The Complete Book of the Summer Olympics (Athens 2004 Edition). Toronto, Canada. .
International Olympic Committee (2001). The Results. Retrieved 12 November 2005.
Sydney Organising Committee for the Olympic Games (2001). Official Report of the XXVII Olympiad Volume 1: Preparing for the Games. Retrieved 20 November 2005.
Sydney Organising Committee for the Olympic Games (2001). Official Report of the XXVII Olympiad Volume 2: Celebrating the Games. Retrieved 20 November 2005.
Sydney Organising Committee for the Olympic Games (2001). The Results. Retrieved 20 November 2005.
International Olympic Committee Web Site

Nations at the 2000 Summer Olympics
2000
2000 in Azerbaijani sport